Kotlyarevsky or Kotliarevskyi (Ukrainian: Котляревський) is a surname of Ukrainian origin. The known persons are:

Ivan Kotliarevsky, Ukrainian writer
Pyotr Kotlyarevsky, Russian general

Occupational surnames
Ukrainian-language surnames